Galesh Kheyl (also Romanized as Gālesh Kheyl and Galesh Khil; also known as Galishkheil and Galish Khel) is a village in Pir Bazar Rural District, in the Central District of Rasht County, Gilan Province, Iran. At the 2006 census, its population was 536, in 144 families.

References 

Populated places in Rasht County